Michèle Kiesewetter (10 October 1984, in Oberweißbach – 25 April 2007, in Heilbronn), a German police officer, was killed by neo-Nazi terrorists. On the 25 April 2007, Michèle Kiesewetter and her partner were on patrol in their police car. At approximately 2:00p.m., they stopped in a corner of a large parking lot in Heilbronn to have a lunch break. Shortly after, both officers were ambushed and shot in the head by two gunmen, approaching from behind the vehicle. Michèle Kiesewetter, sitting in the driver's seat, was fatally injured. Her partner, sitting in the passenger's seat, was heavily injured, but survived the attack. When the police and the ambulance arrived on the scene, both officers were lying on the ground, next to their car, and their handguns and handcuffs were stolen. The gunmen have also been implicated with the murders of nine other people, most with Turkish roots, between 2000 and 2006, the so-called NSU murders.

Aftermath
Following her death, the investigation focused on the so-called Phantom of Heilbronn. The investigations were concentrated in a special task force “parking lot” at the Heilbronn police department. In January 2009, the reward for clues regarding the whereabouts of the person was increased to €300,000.

Her service pistol, a Heckler & Koch P2000, was later retrieved, along with that of her colleague, when Uwe Böhnhardt and Uwe Mundlos, two German neo-Nazis, committed suicide in Eisenach, Germany on 4 November 2011,  Forensic experts also found traces of DNA on evidence recovered from among the remains of the neo-Nazi trio's flat at Zwickau that further strengthen the link.

See also
List of unsolved murders
National Socialist Underground
Phantom of Heilbronn

References

1984 births
2000s in Baden-Württemberg
2007 murders in Germany
2007 deaths
2007 in Germany
April 2007 events in Europe
Crimes against police officers in Germany
Deaths by firearm in Germany
Deaths by person in Germany
Female murder victims
German police officers killed in the line of duty
German terrorism victims
Heilbronn
Murder in Baden-Württemberg
Neo-Nazi attacks in Germany
People from Saalfeld-Rudolstadt
People murdered in Germany
Terrorism deaths in Germany
Unsolved murders in Germany
Victims of serial killers